(CAJ), established in 1950, is a private Christian school in the city of Higashikurume, Tokyo, Japan that provides a Christian American-style education in English. As of 2010, CAJ had over 465 students, from kindergarten through high school. About 48% of the students are children of Christian missionaries who work for some 40 different mission organizations. The students come from more than 25 countries, with 41% from the United States, 32% from Japan, and 12% from Korea. Most students commute to school by public transportation, bicycle or walking.  The four-acre (16,000 m²) campus in the western suburbs of Tokyo also includes a classroom building, auditorium, library, gymnasium, computer lab, home economics and industrial arts facilities, and a dining hall.

Mission
The stated mission of Christian Academy in Japan is to equip students to serve Japan and the world for Christ.

Activities 
CAJ has a wide range of activities for its students. Chapel is included for all ages. Elementary school activities include several musical groups and various field trips. Middle and high school activities include the CAJ Student Council, sports, drama, music, field trips, yearbook, school newspaper, and community service opportunities.

CAJ has an award winning Robotics program. CAJ VEX Robotics teams have won numerous awards at regional competitions and were selected to represent Japan at the World VEX Robotics World Championship in 2016, 2017, 2018, 2019, 2020, 2021, 2022, and 2023. At the fall 2018 regional championship competing with schools from Northeast Asia and Hawaii, CAJ teams won the Judges Award and the Excellence Award (overall first place).

History 
In July 2019, the Christian Academy in Japan hired Tellios to start investigating 66 cases of alleged past abuse of students. The cases date as early as the late 1950s and include physical and sexual abuse by faculty to students.

Sponsoring mission groups 
Christian Academy in Japan is owned and operated by the following six evangelical mission groups:
 TEAM (The Evangelical Alliance Mission)
 Christian Reformed World Missions
 Evangelical Covenant Church Board of World Missions
 OMS
 SEND International 
 WorldVenture (formerly CBInternational)

See also
 List of high schools in Tokyo
 List of junior high schools in Tokyo
 List of elementary schools in Tokyo

References

External links 

Educational institutions established in 1950
Elementary schools in Japan
Private schools in Tokyo
International schools in Tokyo
1950 establishments in Japan
Higashikurume, Tokyo